The Eyalet of Silistra or Silistria, later known as Özü Eyalet meaning Province of Ochakiv was an eyalet of the Ottoman Empire along the Black Sea littoral and south bank of the Danube River in southeastern Europe. The fortress of Akkerman was under the eyalet's jurisdiction.

History

It was named after Silistra, since its governor often resided in this Danubian fortress. Around 1599, it was expanded and raised to the level of an eyalet likely as a benefit to its first governor-general, the khan of Crimea.  It was centered on the regions of Dobruja, Budjak (Ottoman Bessarabia), and Yedisan and included the towns of Varna, Kustendja (Constanța), Akkerman (Bilhorod-Dnistrovs'kyi), and Khadjibey (Odessa) with its capital at the fortresses of Silistra (now in Bulgaria) or Özi (now Ochakiv in Ukraine).

In the 17th century, Silistra Eyalet was expanded to the south and west to include most of modern Bulgaria and European Turkey including the towns of Adrianople (Edirne), Filibe (Plovdiv), and Vidin. In the late 17th and early 18th centuries, a series of Russo-Turkish Wars truncated the eyalet in the east with Russia eventually annexing all of Yedisan and Budjak  to the Danube by 1812.

Edirne Eyalet was constituted from south of Silistra Eyalet in 1830. With Ottoman administrative reforms of 1864 the Silistra Eyalet was reconstituted as the Danube Vilayet.

Administrative division
According to Sancak Tevcih Defteri, eyalet consisted of eight sanjaks between 1700 and 1730 as follows:
 Sanjak of Özi (Pașa Sancağı, Dnieper), centered at Özi-Kale (Ochakiv)
 Sanjak of Silistre (Silistra)
 Sanjak of Vidin (Vidin)
 Sanjak of Niğbolu (Nikopol)
 Sanjak of Kırk Kilise (Kırklareli)
 Sanjak of Çirmen (Ormenio)
 Sanjak of Vize (Vize)
 Sanjak of Tağan Geçidi (until 1699)

Sanjaks in the early 19th century:
 Sanjak of Niğbolu
 Sanjak of Çirmen (after 1829, its capital was Edirne)
 Sanjak of Vize
 Sanjak of Kırk Kilise
 Sanjak of Akkerman, which was only a military command in Bilhorod (Akkerman) in the Budzhak
 Sanjak of Vidin

Beylerbeys
 1615? - ? Iskender Pasha
 1621–1623 Khan Temir
 1631? - Late Spring 1632  Abaza Mehmed Pasha
 Late Spring 1632 - ? Murtaza Pasha
 c.1657 Melek Ahmed Pasha
 c.1683 Mustafa Pasha

References

Bibliography 

Eyalets of the Ottoman Empire in Europe
Ottoman period in the history of Bulgaria
Ottoman period in Romania
Ottoman period in Moldova
Ottoman period in Ukraine
History of Silistra
States and territories established in 1599
1593 establishments in the Ottoman Empire
1864 disestablishments in the Ottoman Empire